Gloria Votsis (born February 9, 1979) is an American film and television actress. She is known for her roles in several television series such as Hawaii Five-0, The Gates, CSI: Miami, Person of Interest, and Suburgatory. She also had a recurring role as Alex Hunter on the USA drama series White Collar.

Early life
Gloria Votsis was born on February 9, 1979, in Pittsford, New York. Votsis grew up in Upstate New York in a self-professed "big Greek family". At the age of 17, she studied abroad for her senior year of high school in France. She attended New York University and worked in finance for several years.  After quitting her job in finance, she relocated to Los Angeles to pursue a career in acting.

Career
Votsis began her career starring in commercials, most notably several toothpaste commercials for Crest. She began her acting career in the early 2000s by appearing in small roles in several American television series and films. In 2010, she portrayed Vanessa Buckley in the supernatural television series The Gates. She also played the role of Alex Hunter in the USA Network series White Collar, appearing in nine episodes. She appeared in episodes of Sex and the City; Six Degrees; Dirt; Cupid; CSI: Miami; The Millers; Grimm and The Night Shift. She also had roles in films The Education of Charlie Banks (2007), Train (2008) and Killer Movie (2008).

Personal life
Votsis speaks French, Greek, and her native English fluently. She lives with her "handsome puggle" named Bernie. Votsis married Scott Davis on September 5, 2015.

Filmography

Television

Film

References

External links 
 

American television actresses
Living people
American film actresses
American people of Greek descent
1979 births
21st-century American women